Neptunia dimorphantha, commonly known as sensitive plant, is a trailing perennial plant from Australia in the family Fabaceae. It produces yellow flowers between July and November.

The species was first formally described by Czech botanist Karel Domin in 1930 in Bibliotheca Botanica, based on a collection in Queensland.

References

dimorphantha
Flora of New South Wales
Flora of the Northern Territory
Flora of Queensland
Flora of South Australia
Flora of Western Australia